Ogmodirus is an extinct genus of plesiosaur found in the Cenomanian-Turonian (Late Cretaceous) Greenhorn Limestone of Kansas. The type species, O. martini, was named by Samuel Wendell Williston and Roy Lee Moodie in 1913.

Discovery and naming
The holotype, KUVP 441, consists of a pelvic girdle, limb elements, and more than fifty cervical (neck) vertebrae from a juvenile discovered in Cloud County, Kansas by C. Boyce in 1909. KUVP 441 was named as Ogmodirus martini by Williston & Moodie (1913) and the species name was amended to martinii by Moodie (1916), but the original name takes precedence. The holotype was described in detail by Williston & Moodie (1917).

A second species, Ogmodirus ischiadicus (based on specimen KUVP 434), was initially placed within its own genus, Thalassiosaurus, and has since been referred to Styxosaurus. It was placed in Ogmodirus by Willison & Moodie (1917).

Classification
According to Welles (1962), Ogmodirus martini may be member of the Elasmosauridae, a group of marine animals related to Elasmosaurus, but the condition of the fossils discovered to date means the genus is dubious beyond Plesiosauria. Sepkoski (2002) assigned Ogmodirus to the Plesiosauria.

See also

 List of plesiosaur genera
 Timeline of plesiosaur research

References

Late Cretaceous plesiosaurs of North America
Cretaceous reptiles of North America
Elasmosaurids
Plesiosaurs of North America
Fossil taxa described in 1913
Taxa named by Samuel Wendell Williston
Sauropterygian genera